VMan is an American men's fashion magazine published as an offshoot of V Magazine, since 2003. The magazine is printed biannually and highlights trends in men's fashion, film, music and art.

History and profile
VMan was established in 2003 by Visionaire Publishing, also responsible for V and Visionaire. As V’s glossy masculine counterpart, regarded as "the vanguard of men’s fashion destinations", the biannual issues reflects the global VMan reader, delivering an unparalleled mix of trend reports, service-based coverage, and celebrity profiles. VMan releases two print issues a year, one for each combined seasonal collections; Spring/Summer and Fall/Winter.

Since its launch, the long-running men’s resource has continued to showcase the best of menswear and offer a curated display of art, film, design, travel, music, grooming, and sports. Lead by editor-in-chief Stephen Gan, past contributors have included Inez van Lamsweerde and Vinoodh Matadin, Hedi Slimane, Mario Testino, Steven Klein, Nick Knight, David Sims, Bruce Weber, and Karl Lagerfeld.

Icons in fashion, film, and music to grace the cover include Tom Brady, David Beckham, Joseph Gordon-Levitt, Gael Garcia Bernal, Ryan Gosling, Orlando Bloom, Ashton Kutcher, Chace Crawford, James Franco, Nick Jonas, Josh Brolin, Kanye West, Andrew Garfield, Taylor Lautner, Alex Pettyfer, Jake Gyllenhaal, Nicholas Hoult, Adam Driver, Zayn Malik, The Weeknd, Timothée Chalamet, Jaden Smith, Mark Ronson, Shawn Mendes, Jacob Elordi, Ewan McGregor, Lil Nas X, Austin Butler and more.

In 2008, VMan inaugurated its first Male Model Search competition with winner Petey Wright, landing the model his first cover for VMan #11, photographed by French photographer and fashion designer Hedi Slimane.

In 2009, VMan crowned Rico Nieves as its latest Male Model Search winner with a cover for VMan #16, photographed by British photographer Nick Knight with SHOWstudio.

In 2013, American actor Jake Gyllenhaal graced the cover of VMan #30, the 10th anniversary issue. Gyllenhaal was photographed for the milestone issue by Hedi Slimane.

See also
 List of VMan magazine cover models

References

External links
 VMan magazine  
 V-Agency

Visual arts magazines published in the United States
Quarterly magazines published in the United States
Magazines established in 2003
Magazines published in New York City
Men's fashion magazines